Marcello Pacifico (born 29 April 1977) is an Italian trade unionist, who is serving as President of ANIEF since 2003.

See also
ANIEF

References 

1977 births
Living people
People from the Province of Palermo
Italian trade unionists
ANIEF